Roque Gastón Máspoli Arbelvide (12 October 1917 in Montevideo – 22 February 2004 in Montevideo) was a Uruguayan football player and coach. He was the goalkeeper for the Uruguay national team that won the 1950 World Cup.  He was also the head coach for the Uruguayan team that won the 1980 Mundialito.

Career
Born in Montevideo, into a Ticinese family originally from Caslano, Maspoli began playing in the youth ranks of Club Nacional de Football. He would make his Uruguayan Primera División debut with Liverpool de Montevideo in 1939.

After one season with Liverpool, he joined C.A. Peñarol. He would spend the rest of his playing career with Peñarol, winning six Primera titles with the club.

In the final match of the 1950 World Cup, known as the "Maracanazo" due to Uruguay's surprising win at the Maracanã stadium in Rio de Janeiro, in front of near 200,000 Brazilian fans, Máspoli allowed one goal as the visitors beat favorites Brazil 2–1.

Máspoli also coached Uruguayan club Peñarol, with which he won five national championships, the Copa Libertadores and the 1966 Intercontinental Cup, when the team beat Real Madrid 4–0 on aggregate. Later, he managed teams in Spain, Peru and Ecuador.

In the 1980s, Máspoli spent several years coaching the Uruguay national team. He took charge again in 1997, becoming the oldest ever manager of any national football team at the age of 80.

Roque Máspoli was hospitalized on 10 February 2004 with heart trouble. He died twelve days later at the age of 86. His remains are buried at Cementerio del Buceo, Montevideo.

Honours

As a player

Club
Nacional
 Primera División: 1933, 1934, 1939
 Torneo de Honor: 1935, 1938, 1939
 Torneo Competencia: 1934

Peñarol
 Primera División: 1944, 1945, 1949, 1951, 1953, 1954

International
Uruguay
 FIFA World Cup: 1950

As a manager

Club
Peñarol
 Primera División: 1964, 1965, 1967, 1985, 1986
 Intercontinental Cup: 1966
 Copa Libertadores: 1966

Defensor Lima
 Peruvian Primera División: 1973

Barcelona SC
 Serie A: 1987

International
Uruguay
 1980 Mundialito Gold medal: 1981

References

External links

Peñarol Football Club (English site)

1917 births
2004 deaths
Footballers from Montevideo
Association football goalkeepers
Uruguayan footballers
Uruguay international footballers
1950 FIFA World Cup players
1954 FIFA World Cup players
FIFA World Cup-winning players
Club Nacional de Football players
Liverpool F.C. (Montevideo) players
Peñarol players
Uruguayan football managers
Peñarol managers
Elche CF managers
1979 Copa América managers
Uruguay national football team managers
Sporting Cristal managers
Barcelona S.C. managers
Club Olimpia managers
Expatriate football managers in Ecuador
Expatriate football managers in Peru
Expatriate football managers in Spain
Ecuador national football team managers
Burials at Cementerio del Buceo, Montevideo
Uruguayan people of Swiss-Italian descent
1975 Copa América managers
Uruguayan expatriates in Spain
Danubio F.C. managers
C.D. El Nacional managers
River Plate Montevideo managers